The Italian Competition Authority (AGCM) is the competition regulator in Italy. It is an Italian quasi-autonomous non-governmental organization established on the basis of Law №287 of 10 October 1990.

As of 2004, the Italian Competition Authority has also been in charge of enforcing laws against conflicts of interest for Holders of Public Office.

As the Italian competition regulator, the Authority has the task of enforcing both Italian and European consumer protection laws.

It is financed by annual allocations through a special chapter of the Ministry of Economic Development's budget. The Financial Law of 2006 introduced partial self-financing: AGCM has full control over the management of these funds for its own operations.

An annual report is presented to the President of the Council of Ministers of Italy.

Duties
The main duties of the authority are:
 Vigilance against abuses from market dominance.
 Vigilance against cartels that may prejudice or restrict fair competition (Anti-competitive practices).
 Vigilance on takeovers to check concentration ratio and verify market impact.
 Consumer protection, against unfair trade practices and false advertising.
 Supervise and penalize the cases of conflict of interest regarding members of Government of Italy.

Powers
The Authority in such cases may conduct investigations or hearings, even with the Guardia di Finanza at his disposal, which may result in a warning or an administrative penalty.

Notable cases

 In 2021, the Authority fined Amazon 1.13 billion euros ($1.28 billion) for alleged abuse of market dominance in intermediation services on marketplaces to favour the adoption of its own logistics service - Fulfilment by Amazon (FBA) - by sellers active on Amazon.it.
 In 2022, Xiaomi the Authority fined around 3.2 million Euros  (21.76 million Yuan), for refusing to repair phones still under warranty.

Presidents
The Italian Competition Authority is led by a Presidents. In its history the following individuals have held this function:
 Francesco Saja (7 November 1990 – 31 July 1994)
 Giuliano Amato (11 November 1994 – 31 December 1997)
 Giuseppe Tesauro (12 March 1998 – 16 February 2005)
 Antonio Catricalà (1 March 2005 – 16 November 2011)
 Giovanni Pitruzzella (29 November 2011 – 30 September 2018)
 Roberto Rustichelli (since 2018)

References

External links
 
AGCM commission hearings are available on Radio Radicale website (in Italian).

Government agencies established in 1990
1990 establishments in Italy
Competition regulators
Regulation in Italy
Consumer organisations in Italy